Linda Jean Broadbelt is an American chemical engineer who is the Sarah Rebecca Roland Professor and Associate Dean for Research of the McCormick School of Engineering and Applied Science at Northwestern University. Her research considers kinetics modeling, polymerization and catalysis.

In 2019, she was elected a member of the National Academy of Engineering for contributions to complex kinetic modeling, particularly for understanding the pathways by which hydrocarbons and polymers undergo pyrolysis.

Early life and education 
Broadbelt was an undergraduate student in chemical and biomolecular engineering at Ohio State University. She was a graduate student in chemical engineering at the University of Delaware, where she studied the thermal stability of high performance polymers, working in the research group of Unidel Dan Rich Chair in Energy Michael Klein.

Research and career 
Broadbelt develops simulations to better understand the kinetics of hydrocarbon chemistry and reacting systems. She joined the faculty at Northwestern University in 1994. At Northwestern, she created computational models that automatically generate reaction mechanisms. In such models, molecules are represented as matrices, manipulations of which allow reactions to take place. Broadbelt has studied biofuels, polymers and nanocomposite materials.

In 2006, Broadbelt was awarded a fellowship from the Fulbright Program. Her fellowship allowed her to join Donna Blackmond at Imperial College London, where she investigated asymmetric catalysis and organocatalysts. In particular, Broadbelt made use of computational chemical methods to explore the asymmetric catalytic reactions that Blackmond worked on experimentally.

Broadbelt was awarded a United States Department of Energy Bioenergy Technologies Office multi-million dollar grant to create highly recyclable plastic. The plastics proposed by Broadbelt break down into harmless products.

Academic service 
From 2009 to 2017, Broadbelt served as Chair of the Department of Chemical and Biological Engineering at Northwestern. In 2010, she was awarded a Sarah Rebecca Roland Professorship. She joined the advisory board of the University of Delaware Department of Chemical and Biomolecular Engineering in 2010. Broadbelt is a member of the American Institute of Chemical Engineers, where she has held various positions of leadership in the Catalysis and Reaction Engineering Division. She serves on the editorial board of the Royal Society of Chemistry journal Molecular Systems Design & Engineering.

Awards and honors 
 1996 National Science Foundation CAREER Award
 2006 Fulbright Distinguished Scholar
 2006 Elected Fellow of the American Association for the Advancement of Science
 2008 American Institute of Chemical Engineers Women in Chemical Engineering Mentorship Excellence Award
 2017 Dorothy Ann and Clarence L. Ver Steeg Distinguished Research Fellowship Award
 2018 American Institute of Chemical Engineers R. H. Wilhelm Award in Chemical Reaction Engineering
 2018 American Chemical Society E. V. Murphree Award in Industrial and Engineering Chemistry
 2019 Elected to the National Academy of Engineering
 2020 Ohio State University Distinguished Alumni Award for Academic Excellence
 2021 Elected to American Academy of Arts and Sciences

Selected publications

References 

Living people
Year of birth missing (living people)
American women chemists
Northwestern University faculty
Ohio State University alumni
University of Delaware alumni
Members of the United States National Academy of Engineering
Fellows of the American Association for the Advancement of Science
American women academics
21st-century American women